Bernard W. Bierman (March 11, 1894 – March 7, 1977) was an American football player and coach of football and basketball. He coached from 1919 to 1950 except for a span during World War II when he served in the U.S. armed forces. Bierman was the head coach at the University of Montana (1919–1921), Mississippi State University (1925–1926), Tulane University (1927–1931), and his alma mater, the University of Minnesota (1932–1941, 1945–1950), compiling a career college football record of 153–65–12. At Minnesota, Bierman's Golden Gophers compiled a 93–35–6 record, won five national championships and seven Big Ten Conference titles, and completed five undefeated seasons.  Bierman was also the head basketball coach at Montana (1919–1922), Mississippi State (1925–1927), and Tulane (1928–1930), tallying a career college basketball mark of 89–51.

Personal life
Bierman grew up in Litchfield, Minnesota and was married to Clara McKenzie Bierman.  They had two sons, William A. Bierman, a lawyer in St. Paul, Minnesota, and James Bierman, of Los Angeles, California.  Bierman was a brother of the Alpha Delta Phi fraternity.

Head coaching record

Football

References

External links
 
 

1894 births
1977 deaths
American football halfbacks
Basketball coaches from Minnesota
Iowa Pre-Flight Seahawks football coaches
Minnesota Golden Gophers football coaches
Minnesota Golden Gophers football players
Mississippi State Bulldogs football coaches
Mississippi State Bulldogs men's basketball coaches
Montana Grizzlies football coaches
Montana Grizzlies basketball coaches
Tulane Green Wave football coaches
Tulane Green Wave men's basketball coaches
College Football Hall of Fame inductees
People from Litchfield, Minnesota
People from Springfield, Minnesota
Coaches of American football from Minnesota
Players of American football from Minnesota